Transcontinental may refer to:

Arts, entertainment, and media
 "Transcontinental", a song by the band Pedro the Lion from the album Achilles Heel
 TC Transcontinental, a publishing, media and marketing company based in Canada, a subsidiary of Transcontinental Inc
 The Transcontinental, a South Australian weekly newspaper published in Port Augusta

Transport
 First transcontinental railroad, United States, 1869
 Ford Transcontinental, a truck manufactured by Ford of Britain
 National Transcontinental Railway, an historic Canadian railway company
 Transcontinental airspeed record
 Transcontinental Express, a train that arrived in San Francisco in 1876 83 hours and 39 minutes after having left New York City
 Transcontinental flight, a flight across a continent, such as from the Atlantic Ocean to the Pacific across the U.S.
 Transcontinental railroad, a railway that crosses a continent, typically from coast to coast
Transcontinental walk, crossing a continent on foot
 Transcontinental SA, an Argentine airline; see Invicta International Airlines
Trans-Australian Railway, a railway linking eastern and western Australia
Trans Continental Airlines, original name of Express.Net Airlines

Other uses
 Transcontinental country, a country that straddles more than one continent
List of transcontinental countries
List of former transcontinental countries
Transcontinental Hotel, a heritage-listed hotel in Brisbane, Queensland, Australia
 Transcontinental Pipeline, a US gas pipeline
 Transcontinental Race, an annual, self-supported, ultra-distance cycling race across Europe
Transcontinental Traverse, a geodetic survey traverse conducted in the Continental United States 
 Transcontinental Treaty or Adams–Onís Treaty, a US—Spain agreement that settled a border dispute
First transcontinental telegraph, first telegraph line to connect eastern and western United States

See also
 Continental (disambiguation)
 Intercontinental (disambiguation)
 Pluricontinentalism